The following universities and colleges are located in Taipei, Taiwan.

Universities
 China University of Science and Technology
 China University of Technology
 Chinese Culture University
 Ming Chuan University
 National Chengchi University
 National Taiwan Normal University
 National Taipei University
 National Taiwan University
 National Taipei University of Business
 National Taipei University of Education
 National Taipei University of Nursing and Health Science
 National Taipei University of Technology
 National Taiwan University of Science and Technology
 National Yang-Ming University
 Shih Chien University
 Shih Hsin University
 Soochow University
 Taipei City University of Science and Technology
 Taipei Medical University
 Taipei National University of the Arts
 Takming University of Science and Technology
 Tatung University
 University of Taipei

Chinese language schools
Major Chinese language schools:
International Chinese Language Institute for foreigners (TMI), at Taiwan Manadarin Institute
International Chinese Language Program (ICLP), formerly Stanford Center and Inter-University Center (IUP), at National Taiwan University
Center for Chinese Language and Cultural Studies (CCLC), formerly Mandarin Training Center (MTC), at National Taiwan Normal University

See also 
 Education in Taiwan
 List of universities in Taiwan
 List of schools in Taipei

 
Universities and colleges in Taipei
Taipei